Gunnar Simenstad (May 14, 1914 – February 2, 1986) was a Norwegian actor. In addition to his stage career, he appeared in several films.

Filmography

 1935: Du har lovet mig en kone! as Marlow
 1937: By og land hand i hand as Adolf, a construction worker
 1940: Frestelse as Ole Arntsen
 1943: Sangen til livet as Nordahl
 1951: Skadeskutt as Rolf Lunde, a doctor
 1953: Den evige Eva as Einar Berge, an estate agent
 1954: Slik kan det gjøres. Husmorfilmen 1954
 1966: Skrift i sne
 1974: Kimen as the third farmer
 1976: Oss as the commander-in-chief

References

External links
 
 Gunnar Simenstad at Sceneweb
 Gunnar Simenstad at the Swedish Film Database

1914 births
1986 deaths
20th-century Norwegian male actors
Male actors from Oslo